Jailoloa is a genus of palm (family Arecaceae), in the subtribe Ptychospermatinae. It has only one currently accepted species, Jailoloa halmaherensis, native to the Moluccas. It only grows on ultramafic soils. The species is currently known only from its type locality in East Halmahera.

References

Ptychospermatinae
Monotypic Arecaceae genera
Endemic flora of the Maluku Islands
Halmahera
Plants described in 2014